Antonis Papadakis, or Kareklas (1893–1980) was a Cretan musician and famous for his superb lyra performance.  He was born in Pervolia, Rethymno, then part of the Ottoman Empire. He started playing the lyra since he was a kid. He is considered one of the most important lyra performers of the early 20th century. When he started playing lyra the laouto was not yet established as an accompanying instrument of the lyre in Crete. 
Thus, he was occasionally using the string instrument boulgari as accompanying instrument, popular at that time in the Rethymnon.  Bouzouki was a typical accompanying instrument for lyra at that time.

Kareklas' bohemian style was characteristic of his time; he died in the Chania incurable asylum in 1980 at the age of 87.

See also 
 Last Words, a short film by Werner Herzog (1968) featuring Kareklas at the age of 75 with bouzouki player L. Daskalakis
 Lyra (Byzantine)
 Lyra (Cretan)
 Music of Crete

External links 
  

1893 births
1980 deaths
People from Rethymno (regional unit)
Cretan musicians
Greek musicians